Craig Lance Pheiffer (born ) is a South African rugby union player who played first class rugby in 2016. His regular position is wing.

References

South African rugby union players
Living people
1991 births
People from Stellenbosch
Rugby union wings
Boland Cavaliers players
Rugby union players from the Western Cape